National Highway 363, commonly referred to as NH 363 is a national highway in  India. It is a spur road of National Highway 63. NH-363 traverses the state of Telangana in India.

Route 

Indaram (Mancherial), Mandamarri, Bellampalli, Tandur, Rebbana, Asifabad, Wankidi - Telangana/Maharashtra border.

Junctions  

  Terminal near Mancherial.

See also 

 List of National Highways in India
 List of National Highways in India by state

Notes 
 In first notification for S.N. 194A, route Sironcha to Atmakur was named as NH 363. This has been replaced as NH 353C with extended route from Sakoli.

References

External links 
 NH 363 on OpenStreetMap

National highways in India
National Highways in Telangana